Saint Christopher-Nevis-Anguilla (or Saint Christopher, Nevis, and Anguilla) was a British colony in the West Indies from 1882 to 1983, consisting of the islands of Anguilla (until 1980), Nevis, and Saint Christopher (or Saint Kitts). From 1882 to 1951, and again from 1980, the colony was known simply as Saint Christopher and Nevis. Saint Christopher and Nevis gained independence in 1983 as the Federation of Saint Kitts and Nevis, while Anguilla would remain a British overseas territory.

History
The islands of Saint Christopher and Nevis had been British colonies since the 17th century, though were always administered separately. A union of Saint Christopher and Nevis had been proposed as early as 1867, when Captain James George Mackenzie was appointed Lieutenant-Governor of Saint Christopher with a mandate to seek an amalgamation of the administrations of the two islands. This proposal met with strong opposition, however, and was withdrawn the following year. In 1871, Saint Christopher and Nevis became presidencies within the Federal Colony of the Leeward Islands, with Anguilla being attached to Saint Christopher as a dependency in the same year. However, in 1882, the legislature of the Leeward Islands passed legislation merging the two presidencies, forming a combined Presidency of Saint Christopher and Nevis.

In 1951, the name of the colony was changed to include Anguilla. The Leeward Islands Colony was disbanded in 1958, due to frequent tension between its members. From 1958 to 1962, Saint Christopher-Nevis-Anguilla formed a province of the West Indies Federation, electing two members to the House of Representatives and also having two senators, appointed by the governor-general. In 1967, the territory of Saint Christopher-Nevis-Anguilla was granted full internal autonomy, as an Associated State of the United Kingdom. The UK retained responsibility for defence and external affairs, while a new judicial system was established, the West Indies Associated States Supreme Court (although the Privy Council remained the highest court of appeal). Later in 1967, Anguilla's leaders expelled the federation's police from the island, and declared its independence as the Republic of Anguilla. On 7 November 1970 commission led by Hugh Wooding, former Chief Justice of Trinidad and Tobago, published report which unanimously refused both the idea of independent Anguilla and the return of the status of British colony and recommend that the island should instead remain a part of Saint Christopher-Nevis-Anguilla. The report was welcomed by Robert Llewellyn Bradshaw while the Council of Anguilla rejected it. Foreign and Commonwealth Office Minister Joseph Godber stated in the House of Commons of the United Kingdom that his government will analyze the report in light of discussions with all interested parties and that no decision unacceptable to people of Anguilla will be made. A series of interim agreements followed that resulted in direct rule of the island from Britain, although it was not formally separated until December 1980, when it was made a separate Crown colony.

Nevis had also attempted to separate from the federation on several occasions, but the island's leaders were unsuccessful in their efforts. However, they did manage to secure greater autonomy for Nevis in the years leading up to independence, which occurred in September 1983 after a delay of several years to allow for negotiations. Sir Frederick Albert Phillips, the first governor of Saint Christopher-Nevis-Anguilla, wrote in 2013:

Politics

List of administrators
From 1882 to 1958, the federation's administrator was under the wider jurisdiction of the Governor of the Leeward Islands. From 1958 to 1962, the administrator was responsible to the Governor-General of the West Indies Federation.

President
 1882–83: Alexander Wilson Moir
 1883–88: Charles Monroe Eldridge (acting to 1885)
 1888–89: Francis Spencer Wigley (acting)

Commissioner
 1889–95: John Kemys Spencer-Churchill

Administrator
 1895–99: Thomas Risely Griffith
 1899–1904: Charles Thomas Cox
 1904–06: Sir Robert Bromley
 1906–16: Thomas Laurence Roxburgh
 1916–25: John Alder Burdon
 1925–29: Thomas Reginald St. Johnston
 1929–31: Terence Charles Macnaghten
 1931–40: Douglas Roy Stewart
 1940–47: James Dundas Harford
 1947–49: Leslie Stuart Greening
 1949: Frederick Mitchell Noad
 1949–56: Hugh Burrowes
 1956–66: Henry Anthony Camillo Howard
 1966–67: Sir Frederick Albert Phillips

Governor
 1967–69: Sir Frederick Albert Phillips
 1969–75: Sir Milton Pentonville Allen (acting to 1972)
 1975–81: Sir Probyn Ellsworth Inniss
 1981–83: Sir Clement Athelston Arrindell

List of heads of government
Chief Minister
 1960–66: Caleb Azariah Paul Southwell
 1966–67: Robert Llewellyn Bradshaw

Premier
 1967–78: Robert Llewellyn Bradshaw
 1978–79: Caleb Azariah Paul Southwell
 1979–80: Sir Lee Llewellyn Moore
 1980–83: Kennedy Alphonse Simmonds

Sport and culture

The national football team debuted in 1938, in a friendly against Grenada, but played only sporadically. It has played more regularly since independence. In cricket, the Anguilla, Nevis, and Saint Kitts national teams competed separately at regional level, although combined teams were occasionally fielded in the past. Delegations from Saint Christopher-Nevis-Anguilla were sent to several editions of the CARIFTA Games, winning medals in 1977 and 1983. At the 1978 Commonwealth Games in Edmonton, Alberta, Canada, the federation sent four competitors (two runners and two cyclists, all male), but failed to win a medal.

References

 
History of Anguilla
Former countries in the Caribbean
Former British colonies and protectorates in the Americas
Former colonies in North America
British Leeward Islands
History of British Saint Christopher and Nevis
British West Indies
West Indies Federation
States and territories established in 1882
States and territories disestablished in 1983
1880s establishments in the Caribbean
1882 establishments in the British Empire
1882 establishments in North America
1983 disestablishments in North America
1983 disestablishments in British Overseas Territories
20th-century disestablishments in the Caribbean